Run the Burbs is a Canadian television sitcom, which premiered on CBC Television on January 5, 2022. The series stars Andrew Phung as Andrew Pham, a suburban stay-at-home dad of two children whose wife Camille (Rakhee Morzaria) is an entrepreneur.

The series was created by Phung and Scott Townend, and is produced by Pier 21 Films.

The series was shot in Hamilton, Ontario in 2021. It is set in the suburbs of the fictional city of Rockridge, which Phung modeled in part on his hometown of Calgary, Alberta.

The second season features new cast additions Gavin Crawford and Sharji Rasool, as well as a tribute episode to Candy Palmater, a first-season cast member who died in December 2021.

Cast
 Andrew Phung as Andrew Pham
 Rakhee Morzaria as Andrew's wife Camille
 Zoriah Wong as Khia Pham, Andrew and Camille's queer teenage daughter
 Roman Pesino as Leo Pham, Andrew and Camille's son
 Ali Hassan as Camille's father Ramesh
 Julie Nolke as Camille's best friend Sam
 Jonathan Langdon as Hudson, a neighbour of the Phams
 Simone Miller as Hudson's daughter Mannix
 Samantha Wan as Cathy, owner of a local bubble tea shop
 Candy Palmater as Candy, a neighbour of the Phams
 Chris Locke as Sebastian, a neighbour of the Phams
 Aurora Browne as Barb

Guest appearances
 Jason "Kardinal Offishall" Harrow as himself (Episode 1)

Episodes

Season 1 (2022)

Season 2 (2023)

References

2022 Canadian television series debuts
Canadian LGBT-related sitcoms
CBC Television original programming
Television shows filmed in Hamilton, Ontario
2020s Canadian LGBT-related comedy television series
2020s Canadian sitcoms